Pythonides lancea is a species of butterfly in the skipper family, found in Brazil and in Argentina.

P. lancea was first described in 1868 by William Chapman Hewitson and named Leucochitonea lancea, after realizing this species was different from P. jovianus previously described by Pieter Cramer.

Gallery

References

Butterflies described in 1868
Hesperiidae